Elia Ostwald (born March 17, 1988) is a German professional ice hockey forward who currently plays on loan with Eispiraten Crimmitschau of the 2.GBun from the Hamburg Freezers of the Deutsche Eishockey Liga (DEL) .

Career statistics

Regular season and playoffs

International

References

External links

1988 births
Living people
Eisbären Berlin players
Hamburg Freezers players
German ice hockey forwards
People from Bad Muskau
Sportspeople from Saxony